is a Japanese gymnast and Olympic champion.

Mitsukuri competed at the 1960 Summer Olympics in Rome where he received a gold medal in team combined exercises. At the 1964 Summer Olympics in Tokyo he again received a gold medal in team combined exercises with the Japanese team. Individually, he performed best on the pommel horse, finishing in fourth and sixth place in 1960 and 1964, respectively.

Mitsukuri received a bronze medal in pommel horse at the 1962 World Artistic Gymnastics Championships, and Japan won the team competition. He received a bronze medal in horizontal bar at the 1966 World Artistic Gymnastics Championships, and Japan won the team competition again.

His wife Taniko Nakamura-Mitsukuri is also a retired Olympic gymnast.

References

1939 births
Living people
Japanese male artistic gymnasts
Gymnasts at the 1960 Summer Olympics
Gymnasts at the 1964 Summer Olympics
Olympic gymnasts of Japan
Olympic gold medalists for Japan
Olympic medalists in gymnastics
Medalists at the 1964 Summer Olympics
Medalists at the 1960 Summer Olympics
Universiade medalists in gymnastics
Universiade gold medalists for Japan
Medalists at the 1961 Summer Universiade
20th-century Japanese people
21st-century Japanese people